The myelencephalon or afterbrain is the most posterior region of the embryonic hindbrain, from which the medulla oblongata develops.

Development

Neural tube to myelencephalon 
During fetal development, divisions of the neural tube that give rise to the hindbrain (rhombencephalon) and the other primary vesicles (forebrain and midbrain) occur at just 28 days after conception.  With the exception of the midbrain, these primary vesicles undergo further differentiation at 5 weeks after conception to form the myelencephalon and the other secondary vesicles.

Myelencephalon to medulla  
Final shape differentiation of the myelencephalon into the medulla oblongata can be observed at 20 weeks gestation.

Medulla oblongata 
The medulla oblongata is part of the brain stem that serves as the connection of the spinal cord to the brain.  It is situated between the pons and the spinal cord.

Function 
The medulla oblongata is responsible for several functions of the autonomic nervous system.  These functions include:

1) Respiration: monitors the acidity of the blood and sends electrical signals to intercostal muscle tissue to increase their contraction rate in order to oxygenate the blood as needed.

2) Cardiac & Vasomotor Center: monitors and regulates cardiovascular activities by:
 Sympathetic excitation in order to increase cardiac output
 Parasympathetic inhibition of cardiac output
 Affecting blood pressure via vasodilation and vasoconstriction
3) Reflexes
 Coughing
 Sneezing
 Swallowing (palatal)
 Vomiting
 Gagging (pharyngeal)
 Jaw jerk (masseter)

Damage/trauma 
Because of its location in the brainstem and its many important roles in the autonomic nervous system, damage to the medulla oblongata is usually fatal.

References 

Animal developmental biology